Kaie Mihkelson (born 12 October 1948) is an Estonian film and stage actress.

Biography

Early life and education 
Mihkelson was born in Pärnu, Estonia on 12 October 1948. She graduated from the Tallinn Polytechnical Institute of Economics in 1969 and the Tallinn State Conservatory (now, the Estonian Academy of Music and Theatre) in 1974.

Career
From 1974 until 1977, Mihkelson was engaged at the Endla Theatre in Pärnu before leaving for the Youth Theater in Tallinn from 1977 until 1988. Mihkelson has been with the Estonian Drama Theatre in Tallinn since 1988. She has also worked as a lecturer at her alma mater, the Estonian Academy of Music and Theatre. Mihkelson has appeared in a number of television and film roles.

Award 
Mikhelson was awarded the Order of the White Star, IV Class in 2008.

Filmography

 The Master of the Desert (1978) - Anna
 Nipernaadi (1983) - Inriid
 Karoliine hõbelõng (1984) - Werewolf
 Õnnelind flamingo (1986) - Leaanika
 Bande (1986) - Lee Wilshire
 Keskea rõõmud (1987) - Helena
 Varastatud kohtumine (1988) - Tiina Kuusberg 
 Äratus (1989) - Woman
 Surmatants (1991) - Margareth
 Vana mees tahab koju (1991) - Inna Valter
 Hotell E (1992) - Jane
 Kuhu põgenevad hinged (2007) - Woman in the Church
 The Class (2007) - Director
 Kuraditõestus (2008) - Juula
 Letters to Angel (2010)
 Kertu (2013) - Doctor
 Sandra saab tööd (2021) - Tiina

References

External links 

1948 births
Living people
Estonian stage actresses
Estonian film actresses
Estonian television actresses
Tallinn University of Technology alumni
Estonian Academy of Music and Theatre alumni
Academic staff of the Estonian Academy of Music and Theatre
Recipients of the Order of the White Star, 4th Class
People from Pärnu